Sebastian Walter Kehl (born 13 February 1980) is a German former professional footballer who played as a defensive midfielder. He is currently the Sporting Director of Borussia Dortmund.

He amassed Bundesliga totals of 314 games and 24 goals over the course of 15 seasons, representing in the competition SC Freiburg and Borussia Dortmund. He won six major titles with the latter club, including three national championships.

A Germany international for five years, Kehl appeared for the nation in two World Cups – finishing second in the 2002 edition – and Euro 2004.

Following his retirement, Kehl first worked as the “Head of First Team Football” for Borussia Dortmund before it was announced that he would be taking over as Sporting Director, following the retirement of Michael Zorc.

Club career
Born in Fulda, Hesse, Kehl joined Hannover 96's youth system in 1996 at the age of 15, going on to appear in two 2. Bundesliga seasons with the first team. In the 2000 summer he signed for SC Freiburg in the Bundesliga, making his debut in the competition on 12 August by playing the full 90 minutes in a 4–0 home win against VfB Stuttgart, and scoring his first goal on 12 December of that year to help to a 2–1 away success over VfL Wolfsburg.

Under manager Volker Finke, Kehl featured mostly as a sweeper, helping the Black Forest club qualify to the 2001–02 UEFA Cup in his first season, before the club suffered relegation in his second season. He was no longer part of the squad, however, as he had left in the 2002 January transfer window to Borussia Dortmund, who went on to win the championship with 15 games and one goal from the player. Previously, in summer 2001, he controversially agreed basic terms with FC Bayern Munich, and even accepted an advanced payment of 1.5 million Deutsche Mark, which was returned in November as Bayern threatened to take legal action.

During his tenure with Dortmund, Kehl was more often than not a starter. He contributed with 12 matches in the 2002–03 UEFA Champions League to help his team reach the second group phase, and amassed 61 league appearances from 2004 to 2006 in back-to-back seventh-place finishes.

On the first day of the 2006–07 campaign, Kehl injured his left knee in a challenge with Bayern's Hasan Salihamidžić, sidelining him for several months and only recovering fully at the start of 2008–09, when he was made captain by new coach Jürgen Klopp. He eventually relapsed on his condition, also losing his importance in the starting XI after the emergence of Sven Bender and Nuri Şahin.

On 27 July 2013, Kehl played the second half of the DFL-Supercup against Bayern Munich, replacing Bender in an eventual 4–2 win. In September, he was put out of action for another lengthy period after injuring his ankle in training.

Kehl began hinting at retirement in March 2014, shortly after having agreed to a one-year extension to his contract. The 35-year-old confirmed it at the end of the 2014–15 season, after having taken part in 21 games to help Dortmund come from behind in the table and qualify to the 2015–16 UEFA Europa League.

In April 2018, Borussia Dortmund announced that Kehl would become its players licence department director starting on 1 June.

In June 2021, Borussia Dortmund announced that Kehl would be the successor to sporting director Michael Zorc following his retirement in the summer of 2022.

International career
Kehl earned the first of his 31 caps for the Germany national team on 29 May 2001, in a 2–0 friendly win against Slovakia in Bremen where he came on for Marko Rehmer after 45 minutes. He scored his first goal on 15 August of that year, contributing to a 5–2 win over Hungary in another exhibition game.

Selected for both the 2002 and the 2006 World Cups, Kehl played twice (against Paraguay and United States) in the former tournament as the Mannschaft finished in second place, and started in two of his four appearances to help to the third place in the latter.

Personal life
Kehl is married to Tina Kehl. They have three children.

Career statistics

Club

International

Scores and results list Germany's goal tally first, score column indicates score after each Kehl goal.

Honours
Borussia Dortmund
Bundesliga: 2001–02, 2010–11, 2011–12
DFB-Pokal: 2011–12
DFL-Supercup: 2013, 2014
UEFA Champions League runner-up: 2012–13

Germany
FIFA World Cup runner-up: 2002; third place 2006
FIFA Confederations Cup third place: 2005

Individual
kicker Bundesliga Team of the Season: 2000–01, 2008–09

References

External links

 

1980 births
Living people
People from Fulda
Sportspeople from Kassel (region)
Footballers from Hesse
German footballers
Germany under-21 international footballers
Germany international footballers
Association football midfielders
Bundesliga players
2. Bundesliga players
3. Liga players
Regionalliga players
Hannover 96 players
SC Freiburg players
Borussia Dortmund players
Borussia Dortmund II players
UEFA Euro 2004 players
2002 FIFA World Cup players
2006 FIFA World Cup players
Borussia Dortmund non-playing staff